Best of Khaled is a greatest hits compilation album by Khaled.

Track listing

"Didi"
"Wahrane"
"Aïcha"
"Abdel Kader" (1,2,3 Soleils)
"Ouelli El Darek"
"Oran Marseille"
"Les Alles"
"Sahra"
"Ne m'en voulez pas"
"N'ssi N'ssi" (Hadj Brahim Khaled/Kada Mustapha)
"Ya-Rayi" (Album Version)
"H'mama"
"Benthi"
"La Terre a Tremblé"
"Mon Premier Amour"

References 

https://web.archive.org/web/20100611140355/http://khaled-lesite.artistes.universalmusic.fr/

2007 greatest hits albums
Khaled (musician) albums